Daniel Ioan Tătaru (born 6 May 1967, Piatra Neamţ, Romania) is a Romanian mathematician at University of California, Berkeley. 

He earned his doctorate from the University of Virginia in 1992, under supervision of Irena Lasiecka.

He won the 2002 Bôcher Memorial Prize for his research on partial differential equations. In 2012 he became a fellow of the American Mathematical Society. In 2013 he was selected as a Simons Investigator in mathematics.

References

External links
Website at UC Berkeley

Living people
20th-century Romanian mathematicians
University of California, Berkeley faculty
University of Virginia alumni
Fellows of the American Mathematical Society
1967 births
International Mathematical Olympiad participants
Simons Investigator
People from Piatra Neamț
21st-century Romanian mathematicians
PDE theorists
Romanian emigrants to the United States